The Gulf or Bay of Honduras is a large inlet of the Caribbean Sea, indenting the coasts of Belize, Guatemala, and Honduras. From north to south, it runs for approximately 200 km (125 miles) from Dangriga, Belize, to La Ceiba, Honduras.

The inner Gulf of Honduras is lined by the Belize Barrier Reef which forms the southern part of the 900 km (600 mile) long Mesoamerican Barrier Reef System, the second-largest coral reef system in the world. The Belize Barrier Reef includes a number of small islands, called cays, and collectively known as the Pelican Cays.

The Gulf of Honduras is marked by complex dynamics of coastal and open waters, and ocean currents, which have produced a very diverse and unique ecosystem with a wide variety of coastal marine waters, including coastline estuaries, barrier beaches, lagoons, intertidal salt marshes, mangrove forests, seagrass beds, keys and barrier reefs.

The gulf receives the runoff from the watersheds of 12 rivers with an estimated discharge of 1,232,000 litres (approx. 300,000 gallons) per second.

Tourists are often taken on boat trips to the Pelican Cays, notably Caye Caulker and Ambergris Caye.

In 1961 Hurricane Hattie swept across the Gulf of Honduras, destroying buildings in Belize.

The infamous pirate Blackbeard spent the winter of 1717–1718 harassing shipping boats sailing to and from the port of Vera Cruz, Mexico and traversing the Bay of Honduras. In April 1718, at Turneffe Atoll, Blackbeard captured the logwood cutting sloop Adventure and forced its captain, David Herriot, to join him. Blackbeard then made Israel Hands captain of the Adventure and began sailing for North Carolina.

Extent

Current 
The Gulf's limits have not been demarcated by the International Hydrographic Organization. Its northernmost point is variously given as Belize City, Dangriga, or Gladden Spit; its easternmost point as Punta Sal, Punta Izopo, or La Ceiba. The northern limits are in the Belize or Stann Creek districts of Belize, while the eastern ones are in the Atlántida Department of Honduras.

Historical 
During the 16th through 20th centuries, the Gulf's limits were thought to run from Cape Catoche to Cape Gracias a Dios.

History

Pre-Columbian

Columbian

20th century 
In 1012 December 1989, the Central American Integration System established the Commission for the Environment and Development, a body charged with coordinating environmental protection policies, projects, and programmes across the region. Upon the 12 October 1994 signing of the Alliance for the Sustainable Development of Central America, the Commission adopted its first regional environmental management plan. In 1995 and 2005, the Commission secured grant financing for its work in the Gulf.

In 1996, nine NGOs in Belize, Guatemala, and Honduras established the Trinational Alliance for the Conservation of the Gulf of Honduras (aka TRIGOH). The alliance seeks to harmonise members' management policies for marine and coastal protected areas in the Gulf, and to coordinate their management and research activities.

Geography

Political

Physical

Terrestrial 
The Gulf's northern (ie Belizean) shores consist mostly of sandy beach ridges, saline tidal swamps, and shelf lagoons. It is dotted with small estuaries, mangrove forests, seagrass beds, patch and barrier reefs, and mangrove and coral cayes. The coast in the mouth of the Gulf (ie Guatemalan coastline) consists mainly of mangrove thickets, large estuaries, seagrass beds, and beaches. The southern coast (in Honduras) is marked by long beaches, vast mangroves, and mangrove and coral cays.

Marine 
The Gulf's continental shelf extends some 9.32–24.85 miles (15–40 km) from shore. The northern shelf holds part of the Belize Barrier Reef, which stretches to the Sapodilla Cayes. The shelf in the mouth of the Gulf holds five parallel submarine ridges of continental origin, which jut out towards the north-northeast. It is cleaved by the Swan Island fault, which divides the North American and Caribbean tectonic plates, and forms the southern boundary of the Cayman Trough.

Climate 
The Gulf's climate is tropical or sub-tropical (ie Am and Af Köppen climate classifications). The wet season is brought by the annual northern migration of the Intertropical Convergence Zone. Tropical storms and hurricanes are regular between August and October, with the Gulf's northeastern (ie Belizean) section averaging 60 storms per century, and the southwestern coast (ie Guatemalan and Honduran) averaging 20 storms per century.

Geology

Terrestrial 
The Gulf's northern (ie Belizean) coast consists primarily of three geologic formations metamorphosed sediments (ie metasediments) and granite intrusions in the Maya Mountains, and coastal alluvial sediments east, southeast, and south of this range. The metasediments are the oldest rocks in Belize, formed during the Palaeozoic era some 300 mya. They form part of the Santa Rosa Group, and are composed of fine-grained phyllites, slates, and mudstones. The alluvial sediments formed during the Tertiary period some 10 mya. Primary soil types are Ossory (from metasediments), Stopper (from granite), Melinda and Puletan (from alluvial sediment), and tintal soils (ie wet, swampy type soils). The Belize Barrier Reef protects this coast from open sea waves. As such, the north-south littoral drift along this coast is primarily driven by waves formed within the reef.

The coast at the mouth of the Gulf (ie Guatemalan coast) consists primarily of alluvial material from the Quaternary era. The southern (ie Honduran) coast consists primarily of sedimentary alluvium (surficial bounders, cobbles, gravel, sand, and mud) and intrusive plutonic formations of granite, granodiorite, and diorite. These formed during the Quaternary and Cretaceous eras. The west-east littoral drift along this coast is driven mainly by open sea waves, which tend to approach the shoreline from east to west.

Marine 
The Gulf is part of the Cayman Trench, one of five deepwater basins in the Caribbean Sea. It contains the open-sea lagoon formed by the Belize Barrier Reef, the Amatique Bay, the Atlantic coast of Guatemala, and the eastern part of the coast of Honduras. Large freshwater discharge from the Sarstoon, Dulce, and Motagua rivers limit coral development in the mouth of the Gulf to a few isolated patches, as at Hunting Caye, for instance. Towards the northeastern section of the Gulf, the continental shelf drops off abruptly, from some 98 feet at the shelf break to some 6,560 feet in the Cayman Trench.

Formation 
The Gulf's northern coast, upon the Yucatan Peninsula, reached its present location during the Late Jurassic age some 150 Mya. It was joined by the Central American platform during the Eocene epoch some 40 Mya, thereby forming a gulf or bay in or about the present location of the Gulf of Honduras.

Hydrology

Watersheds 
Eight primary, and 17 subsidiary, watersheds replenish the Gulf. Annually, the Gulf receives some 17.75–18.23 cubic miles (74–76 km3) of water from its watersheds. Sedimentary discharge from Belizean rivers into the Gulf was, on average, 80, 15, and 5 percent mud, clay, and sand, respectively. Peak freshwater and sedimentary discharge occurs in the wet season, which usually exceeds dry season discharge by a factor of 59.

Currents 
The Gulf's open sea experiences the Caribbean Current and a quasi-permanent cyclonic eddy generated in the southwest corner of the Cayman Tranch. The latter is centred at about 19°N 86°W, generating a sea surface height anomaly of negative , with peripheral current velocities of 7.9 to 15.8 inches per second (0.2–0.4 m/s).

The Caribbean Current flows from east to west in the deep waters off the continental shelf of Honduras. In doing so, every few months, it generates cyclonic, counterclockwise gyres, characterised by a central water level depression of 812 inches (2030 cm), which take 23 months to progress westwards along the Honduran coast towards the Belize Barrier Reef.

Along the Gulf's northern (ie Belizean) coast, persistent northeasterly trade winds maintain a constant southerly downwelling, with speeds of 3.9 to 7.9 inches per second (0.1–0.2 m/s). This southern drift, in turn, drives a counterclockwise eddy along the Gulf's mouth, and along its southern coast (ie the Guatemalan and Honduran coasts).

Tides 
The semidiurnal and diurnal constituent amplitudes range within 1.182.76 inches (0.030.07 m). The dominant semidiurnal and diurnal tidal constituents propagate westwards along the coast of Honduras, and northwards along the Belize Barrier Reef. Currents induced by the tide may be appreciable in constricted channels along the Belize Barrier Reef, reaching 15.75 inches per second (0.4 m/s) here. Astronomical tides are weak, and at times completely dominated by meteorological tides. For instance, the storm surge associated with Hurricane Mitch raised the mean water level at Gladden Spit 9.2 feet (2.8 m) on 27 October 1998.

Waves 
The northeasterly and easterly trade winds give rise to both wind waves and swell, especially during December–May. These are intensified by cold northerlies and north-westerlies blowing in from North America during November–April in bursts lasting one to three days. Waves are typically 3.28–9.84 feet (1-3 m) high, with periods of 3-7 seconds, though hurricanes may increase their height to 32.81 feet (10 m), and their period to 12.7 seconds. Mean wave direction is towards 255° (ie towards the west-southwest). The wet season's thunderstorms are often accompanied by intense gusts from varying directions, followed by periods of calm.

Water 
A thermocline develops offshore at 49 to 66 feet (15 to 20 m). Sea-surface salinity in the Gulf averages 36,200 parts per million (36.2 g per kg) offshore, but drops off closer towards the coast, and especially near estuaries like the Amatique Bay, where salinity dips to 5,000–10,000 ppm (5–10 g/kg) during the wet season. Visibility in the Gulf ranges from less than  near estuaries to a maximum of  inside the Belize Barrier Reef. Dissolved oxygen ranges from 0.9 ppm (0.9 mg/L) near coastal areas of wastewater discharge, to 5.2–9.6 ppm (5.2–9.6 mg/L) near the Belize Barrier Reef. pH ranges from 5.8 in areas without marine vegetation (eg seagrass beds), to 7.4 in lagoons and estuaries, to 8.8 near coral reefs. Nitrate and phosphate concentrations range from levels below the detection threshold (near coral reefs), to 7.0 μM and 1.0 μM respectively (near estuaries). Chlorophyll-a concentrations range from undetectable to 0.55 ppm (0.55 mg/L).

Ecology

Ecosystems 
The most significant ecosystems in the Gulf are mangrove forests, seagrass beds, and coral reefs, these being some of the most productive ecosystems on Earth, in terms of mean net primary productivity, and some of the most vulnerable to changes in water quality.

Mangrove forests 
The Gulf's mangrove forests are dominated by red mangroves, though black, white, and buttonwood mangroves are also present. Mangrove stands act as sediment traps in estuaries, thereby protecting coral reefs from sedimentation, and providing a primary source of nutrition and a nursery habitat for coastal marine life. They also act as a physical buffer from tropical storms for inland settlements. The largest forests sit on the Sarstoon–Temash, and the Port Honduras–Payne's Creek areas (on the southern coast of Belize, and the Atlantic coast of Guatemala). Smaller forests are located near Livingston, Dulce River, Puerto Barrios, Punta de Manabique, and in the Jeanette Kawas National Park.

Seagrass beds 
The Gulf's seagrass beds are dominated by turtle grass, though shoal, manatee, and tape grasses also appear. Seagrass meadows are predominantly found in clear, sandy-bottomed, surf-free, shallow waters, as found off the coast of Belize, in the Amatique Bay, and in Graciosa Bay. They provide a source of nutrition for marine life, and help stabilise the coast. In Belize, they serve as an important habitat for queen conch, the country's second-most important commercial fish species.

Coral reefs 

The most significant coral reefs in the Gulf are those of the Belize Barrier Reef, itself part of the Mesoamerican Barrier Reef, the second-largest reef in the world. It is composed of lagoon patch reefs, fringing reefs, and offshore atolls. It is home to some 60 coral, 350 mollusc, and 500 fish species. Isolated coral patches dot the Guatemalan and Honduran coasts of the Gulf.

Biodiversity 
The Gulf's marine life is particularly diverse. It is home to a number of threatened and endangered marine species, most notably West Indian manatees, and green, leatherback, and hawksbill turtles.

Protection 
Belize was the first country in the Gulf to establish a system of protected areas. The Crown Lands Ordinance of 1924 authorised the Governor-in-Council to classify some Crown land as protected areas. The first area so classified was the Half Moon Caye Crown Reserve, a bird sanctuary established on 1 September 1928. Guatemala and Honduras established protected areas by the 1990s. Over 43, 29, and 27 percent of the territory of Belize, Guatemala, and Honduras, respectively, are under some form of protection. Efforts to establish an international protected area in the Gulf have been hindered by the Belizean–Guatemalan territorial dispute.

Economy

Demographics 
The Gulf proper encompasses the Toledo and Stann Creek districts of Belize, the Izabal department of Guatemala, and the Cortés and Atlántida departments of Honduras, though the Gulf's watersheds encompass additional districts and departments. These districts are predominantly rural, ethnically diverse, and agrarian.

Agriculture 
Agriculture is the dominant economic activity in the Gulf, employing over 30 percent of the labour force in Belize's southern districts, for instance. Agriculture is undertaken both for subsistence and for commerce, with coffee, cacao, and bananas being the lead exports. Bananas are an important export in all three countries of the Gulf, while coffee is a major product of Guatemala and Honduras. Smallholders tend to focus on maize, beans, and maicillo.

Fisheries 
The Gulf sustains a number of commercially-fished species, including shrimp, spiny lobster, queen conch, and scale fish (eg swordfish, jurel, sea bass, barracuda, tuna, pejerrey, and anchovy). Some 14.3 million pounds of fish are caught in the Gulf each year, worth some $22.8 million ( million USD), with spiny lobster, queen conch, shrimp, and sardines being the major earners. The Belizean coast is particularly known for its shrimping grounds, especially off the Moho, Temash, and Sarstoon rivers, where over 150,000 pounds of shrimp are caught annually by some 200 small-scale fishermen and 10 large-scale trawlers. In the southern coast of the Gulf, some 1,415 Guatemalan and 647 Honduran small-scale fisherman are active.

Aquaculture 
Four aquaculture farms operate on the Belizean coast of the Gulf. These predominantly grow whiteleg shrimp. In 1999, these farms grew prawn in 107 ponds spanning 722 acres, with an annual production of over two million pounds for local consumption and export.

Tourism 
Tourism is the second-largest foreign exchange earner in the Gulf countries. In Belize, tourism has historically focussed on cayes and reefs in the northern part of the country, outside the Gulf. In 2001, for instance, only 11.1 percent of tourists were destined towards the country's southern districts, accounting for only 6 percent of income derived from tourist accommodation. Activities were primarily eco-cultural, with the main attractions being Mayan archaeological sites and various marine and coastal parks. Tourism infrastructure in the Guatemalan and Honduran coasts is more limited (with the exception of the Honduran Bay Islands).

Transport 
The major port facilities in the Gulf are the Big Creek and Belize City ports in Belize, Puerto Barrios and Puerto Santo Tomás in Guatemala, and Puerto Cortés in Honduras, with the Honduran port being the only deepwater port in Central America, and one of the best equipped for cargo. In 2001, these ports accommodated nearly 4,000 ships and 12 million metric tonnes of cargo.

Industry 
Industrial manufacturing is limited in the Gulf, particularly in the Belizean coast, where the only major factories in 2003 were two citrus and one rice processing plants. Guatemalan and Honduran manufacturing are heavily concentrated on the Gulf's watersheds.

Notes

Citations

References

News

Journals

Print

Web

Maps

Reports

External links
When Blackbeard Scourged the Seas, History.org

Honduras
Honduras
Bodies of water of Belize
Bodies of water of Honduras
Bodies of water of Guatemala
Guatemala–Honduras border
Belize–Guatemala border
Honduras
Bodies of water of Central America